Tomás Antonio Álvarez de Acevedo Ordaz was a Spanish colonial administrator who twice served as interim Royal Governor of Chile, first in 1780 and again between 1787 and 1788.

Additional information

Sources

Royal Governors of Chile
18th-century Spanish people
Year of death unknown
Year of birth unknown